was a Japanese politician, and past mayor of the city of Nagano, the capital of Nagano Prefecture, in central Japan. Tsukada won his first mayoral contest in 1985. He served four full 4-year terms, until November 10, 2001. In 1997, Tsukada served as the Vice President of the Japan Association of City Mayors.

He then graduated from the School of Commerce at Waseda University in 1958. From 1967, he served on the Nagano City Council, and from 1975 until 1985, he served in the Nagano Prefectural Assembly. He was elected mayor in 1985 in his first candidacy. In addition, he served as chairman of the Nagano City-Hokuriku Shinkansen Liaison Council.

Tsukada retired from municipal politics in 2001. Following retirement from politics, Tsukada served as an auditor at Nagano Jidosha Center, and from 2007 an external auditor at Moriya Corporation in Nagano. Tsukada died on February 22, 2023, at the age of 86.

1998 Winter Olympics
Tsukada was mayor during the early preparation and bid process for the 1998 Winter Olympics as well as through the Games. He served as Vice President of the Nagano Olympic Organizing Committee (NAOC) from 1991 when the committee was officially established. 

Following the closing ceremonies of the 1994 Winter Olympics, an International Environmental Expedition had departed Lillehammer, Norway. They traveled by dogsled, sailboat and bicycle over two and a half years. On September 25, 1996, 500 days before the games started, they arrived in Nagano where their message was delivered to Mayor Tsukada. Following the 1998 Winter Olympics, Tsukada sent a similar message to the organizers in Salt Lake City.

Tsukada organized the first Host City Mayors' Conference to discuss Olympics in the 21st Century. The mayors at the time from Sapporo (1972 Winter Olympics), Calgary (1988 Winter Olympics), Albertville (1992 Winter Olympics), Lillehammer (1994 Winter Olympics) and Salt Lake City (2002 Winter Olympics) attended, along with the mayor of Olympia (home of the Ancient Olympic Games) as observer. Following the Mayors' Conference, a declaration was released which included:

With 200 days to go before the opening of the 1998 Games, a live celebration in Tokyo, Nagano, and Sydney, the host of the 2000 Summer Olympics, took place on NAOC's webpage, with Tsukada in Nagano and Frank Sartor, the Lord Mayor of Sydney at the time. In December 1997, Tsukada, along with Japanese Olympic Committee President Hironoshin Furuhashi, and others, headed a delegation to the Hellenic Olympic Committee. At the Temple of Hera, Tsukada and the NAOC received the flame for the start of the 1998 Winter Olympics torch relay. On February 6, 6, 1998 the Olympic flame arrived in Nagano City after a three-route relay across Japan. Kristi Yamaguchi (American sansei and gold medalist figure skater at the 1992 Winter Olympics), Masae Kasai (gold medalist in volleyball at the 1964 Summer Olympics), and Yuko Emoto (gold medalist in judo at the 1996 Summer Olympics) passed their flames to Eishiro Saito, President of NAOC, and two NAOC Vice presidents, Goro Yoshimura (the governor of Nagano Prefecture) and Tsukada, who in turn lit the flame of IOC President Juan Antonio Samaranch.

In February 1998, at the start of the 1998 Winter Olympics, Tsukada described the benefits that Olympics brought to Nagano: "We have received tangible and intangible assets... We went through various difficulties and hardships as the host city, but it has been worth it". During the early days of promoting Nagano as a possible host for the 1998 Games, Tsukada came to realize that the city of Nagano had limited name recognition. When talking with IOC members in Albertville in 1989, they asked Tsukada whether it snowed in Nagano, confusing Nagano with the city of Nagoya which had lost the bid to Seoul for the 1988 Summer Olympics.

It was Mayor Tsukuda who passed the Olympic flag to Salt Lake City Mayor Deedee Corradini at the closing ceremonies of the 1998 Winter Games. Following the 2002 Winter Olympic bid scandal that broke in late 1998, Mayor Tsukada was quoted as saying:

Following the scandal to hit Salt Lake City, it was learned that NAOC spent approximately $14 million to woo IOC members. Tsukada said: "The burden is too much ... some moderation, some balance" must return to the Olympics.

Mayoralty elections

References

Sources

Citations

1936 births
2023 deaths
People from Nagano (city)
20th-century Japanese politicians
Mayors from Nagano (city)
21st-century Japanese politicians
Japanese municipal councilors
Politicians from Nagano Prefecture
Members of the Nagano Prefectural Assembly
Recipients of the Olympic Order
Waseda University alumni